The Nomads is an American sports drama film directed by Brandon Eric Kamin and starring Tika Sumpter and Tate Donovan. It premiered at the 28th Philadelphia Film Festival in October, 2019, and received the Filmadelphia Audience Award for Best Feature Film, as well as the Audience Award for Best Feature Film at the 2019 Napa Valley Film Festival. The film is inspired by the North Philly Nomads U19  rugby club and premiered on Bounce TV on January 20, 2020, on Martin Luther King, Jr. Day.

Cast
Tika Sumpter as Cassey “Mac” McNamara
Tate Donovan as Mark Nolin
 Thomas Pierce as Jaymie
 Vladimir Versailles as Banner
 Devon Ray as Kahlil
 Andy Riddle as O'Brien
 Marla Mindelle as Kate
 Christopher Mann as Principal Wade
 Khalil McMillan as Coach KJ
 Raekwon as Ice

References

External links

2010s sports drama films
2019 films
Films shot in Philadelphia
2010s American films
American sports drama films
2019 directorial debut films